Bhootanth Market is a Lucknow Metro station in Lucknow. Before February 2019, the station had was known by its initially  proposed name of Ramsagar Mishra Nagar metro station.

Station layout

Entry/Exit

References

Lucknow Metro stations